Sergio Romagnoli (b. Fabriano, on August 16, 1969) is an Italian politician. He is a member of the XVIII legislature of Italy.

Biography

Election as Senator 
In the 2018 general elections of Italy, he was elected to the Senate of the Republic. He was nominated and elected on the platform of the Five Star Movement in the Marche district.

References 

Living people
People from Fabriano
21st-century Italian politicians
Senators of Legislature XVIII of Italy
1969 births
20th-century Italian people